AccountAbility is an independent, global, not-for-profit organisation promoting accountability, sustainable business practices and corporate responsibility. It is a self-managed partnership, governed by its multi-stakeholder network.

AccountAbility was established in London, United Kingdom in 1995 with the stated aim to “develop new tools, thinking and connections that enable individuals, institutions and alliances to respond better to global challenges”. The organization has offices in London, New York, Washington D.C., Johannesburg, São Paulo and Beijing.
 
AccountAbility's work is closely related to the Corporate Social Responsibility (CSR) field.

See also
Corporate Social Responsibility (CSR)
Global Reporting Initiative
Social accounting

References

External links
Official Site
AA1000AS Register See which companies are currently using the AA1000AS
Responsible Competitiveness Website

Business organisations based in London
Business ethics organizations
International economic organizations